The following article presents a summary of the 1955 football (soccer) season in Brazil, which was the 54th season of competitive football in the country.

Torneio Rio-São Paulo

Final Standings

Championship playoff

Portuguesa declared as the Torneio Rio-São Paulo champions.

State championship champions

(1)Goytacaz won a competition named Supercampeonato (Superchampionship), which was an extra tournament.

Brazil national team
The following table lists all the games played by the Brazil national football team in official competitions and friendly matches during 1955.

References

 Brazilian competitions at RSSSF
 1955 Brazil national team matches at RSSSF

 
Seasons in Brazilian football
Brazil